Derbyshire County Cricket Club in 1936 was the cricket season when the English club Derbyshire won the County Championship for the first and only time. They had been playing for sixty five years and it was their thirty-eighth season in the County Championship.

1936 season

Success in the County Championship saw the culmination of five years effort by A. W. Richardson since he became captain in 1931. Derbyshire had actually come second in the championship in 1935 with a better set of results. Middlesex and Yorkshire made strong challenges in the closing weeks of the 1936 season which kept tensions high in the Derbyshire camp. When he heard that the Championship had been settled the Duke of Devonshire, the Derbyshire President, left a shooting party at Bolton Abbey in a hurry to get to Derby and join the public reception given to the players on their return.

Derbyshire played 28 games in the County Championship, and one match against Oxford University and one match against the touring Indians. Stan Worthington and Leslie Townsend tied as top scorers in the County Championships, but Worthington's 174 against Oxford University gave him the edge in first class batting positions. Bill Copson's 140 wickets made him top bowler for the county.

Worthington also played for England in Test matches against the Indians.

George Langdale made his debut for Derbyshire and went on to play one first team game in 1937. Samuel Hunt also made his debut, but only played the 1936 season

Matches

{| class="wikitable" style="width:100%;"
|-
! style="background:#efefef;" colspan="6"| List of matches
|- style="background:#efefef;"
!No.
!Date
!V
!Result 
!Margin
!Notes
|-
|1
|6 May 1936
|HampshireAt County Ground, Southampton 
| style="background:#fc0;"|Drawn
|
|<small>R H Moore 100; C G A Paris 101
|- 
|2
|9 May 1936
|Oxford University  The University Parks, Oxford
| style="background:#0f0;"|Won
|Innings and 130 runs
|Not a County Championship matchT S Worthington 174; R F H Darwell-Smith 5–134
|- 
|3
 |13 May 1936
| Kent  Bat and Ball Ground, Gravesend
| style="background:#f00;"|Lost
|10 wickets
|A P Freeman 7–29; W H Copson 5–57; D V P Wright 5–31
|- 
|4
|16 May 1936
|  Surrey County Ground, Derby
| style="background:#0f0;"|Won 
|16 runs
| A R Gover 5–63; W H Copson 5–33 and 7–19; F R Brown 5–53
|- 
|5
 |23 May 1936
|  Sussex   Queen's Park, Chesterfield  
| style="background:#0f0;"|Won 
|Innings and 25 runs 
|L F Townend 182;W H Copson 5–42 
|- 
|6
 |27 May 1936
| Gloucestershire  Ashley Down Ground, Bristol  
| style="background:#0f0;"|Won 
|10 Wickets
|R A Sinfield 7–54; T. B. Mitchell 5–40
|- 
|7
 |30 May 1936
| Essex County Ground, Derby 
| style="background:#fc0;"|Drawn
|
|
|- 
|8
 |3 Jun 1936
| Northamptonshire  County Ground, Northampton 
| style="background:#0f0;"|Won 
|7 Wickets
 |W H Copson 6–24
|- 
|9
|10 Jun 1936
|  Gloucestershire  County Ground, Derby 
| style="background:#0f0;"|Won 
|10 Wickets
| T. B. Mitchell 7–26
|- 
|10
|13 Jun 1936
| Yorkshire Queen's Park, Chesterfield 
| style="background:#fc0;"|Drawn
| 
|L F Townsend 101; W E Bowes 5–66; T. B. Mitchell 6–60
|- 
|11
|17 Jun 1936
|  Somerset  Rutland Recreation Ground, Ilkeston 
| style="background:#f00;"|Lost 
|10 Wickets
 |H Hunt 7–49; T. B. Mitchell 5–90
|- 
|12
|20 Jun 1936
| Warwickshire  Edgbaston, Birmingham 
| style="background:#0f0;"|Won 
|Innings and 10 runs
|L F Townsend 5–44 and 7–46; T. B. Mitchell 5–42
|- 
|13
 |24 Jun 1936
|  Worcestershire<small> 
Queen's Park, Chesterfield
| style="background:#0f0;"|Won 
|3 Wickets
|H H I H Gibbons 99; W H Copson 5–34; R T D Perks 5–63
|- 
|14
|27 Jun 1936
|Lancashire  Park Road Ground, Buxton 
| style="background:#fc0;"|Drawn
|
|F S Booth 6–16; A V Pope 5–53
|- 
|15
 |1 Jul 1936
| Worcestershire   County Ground, New Road, Worcester  
| style="background:#0f0;"|Won 
|Innings and 123 runs
|W H Copson 5–38 and 7–16
|- 
|16
 |4 Jul 1936
|  Warwickshire  Queen's Park, Chesterfield  
| style="background:#0f0;"|Won 
|Innings and 159 runs
|T S Worthington 163; T. B. Mitchell 5–52
|- 
|17
 |8 Jul 1936
| Hampshire Queen's Park, Chesterfield 
| style="background:#fc0;"|Drawn
|
|L F Townsend 153
|- 
|18
|11 Jul 1936
|Lancashire  Old Trafford, Manchester 
| style="background:#fc0;"|Drawn
|
|F M Sibbles 7–36
|- 
|19
 |15 Jul 1936
| Kent  The Town Ground, Burton-on-Trent  
| style="background:#0f0;"|Won 
|141 Runs 
|L F Townsend 115; A V Pope 5–48
|- 
|20
 |18 Jul 1936
| Indians  County Ground, Derby 
| style="background:#fc0;"|Drawn
|
|Not a County Championship matchW H Copson 5–44
|- 
|21
 |22 Jul 1936
| Yorkshire  Bramall Lane, Sheffield  
| style="background:#fc0;"|Drawn
|
|T S Worthington 135; A Mitchell 103;W H Copson 6–60
|- 
|22
 |25 Jul 1936
|  Nottinghamshire Rutland Recreation Ground, Ilkeston  
| style="background:#f00;"|Lost 
|6 Wickets
|  T. B. Mitchell 6–87; W Voce 6–43
|- 
|23
 |1 Aug 1936
| Essex   County Ground, Chelmsford  
| style="background:#0f0;"|Won 
|20 runs
|K Farnes 5–20; T P B Smith 5–62; T. B. Mitchell 6–25
|- 
|24
 |5 Aug 1936
| Surrey  Kennington Oval 
| style="background:#fc0;"|Drawn
|
|D Smith 106; T. B. Mitchell 5–88
|- 
|25
 |8 Aug 1936
| Leicestershire County Ground, Derby  
| style="background:#0f0;"|Won 
|9 Wickets
|W H Copson 5–40; T. B. Mitchell 5–57 and 5–42; G Geary 5–39
|- 
|26
 |15 Aug 1936
| Nottinghamshire  Town Ground, Worksop 
| style="background:#fc0;"|Drawn
|
|W W Keaton 100; C B Harris 107
|- 
|27
 |19 Aug 1936
| Sussex  The Saffrons, Eastbourne  
| style="background:#fc0;"|Drawn
|
| J Langridge 126; W H Copson 6–87
|- 
|28
 |22 Aug 1936
|  Northamptonshire  Queen's Park, Chesterfield  
| style="background:#fc0;"|Drawn
|
| R J Partridge 5–69; A V Pope 6–129
|- 
|29
 |26 Aug 1936
| Somerset Rowden Road, Wells  
| style="background:#f00;"|Lost 
|1 Wicket
|A V Pope 5–35; A W Wellard 5–47; W H Copson 6–81
|- 
|30
 |29 Aug 1936
| Leicestershire Oakham School Ground 
| style="background:#0f0;"|Won 
|Innings and 66 runs
|D Smith 169; T S Worthington 102
|-

Statistics

County Championship batting averages

In addition, John Gilbert appeared for Derbyshire against Oxford University.

County Championship bowling averages

Wicket-keeper

H Elliott Catches 50 Stumping 12

See also
Derbyshire County Cricket Club seasons
1936 English cricket season

References

1936 in English cricket
Derbyshire County Cricket Club seasons
English cricket seasons in the 20th century